Safety and Health in Construction Convention, 1988 is  an International Labour Organization Convention.

It was established in 1988, with the preamble stating:
Having decided upon the adoption of certain proposals with regard to safety and health in construction,...

Ratifications 
As of November 2022, the convention had been ratified by 34 states.

External links 
Text
Ratifications.

Health treaties
International Labour Organization conventions
Occupational safety and health treaties
Treaties entered into force in 1991
Treaties concluded in 1988
Construction law
Treaties of Albania
Treaties of Algeria
Treaties of Belarus
Treaties of Belgium
Treaties of Bolivia
Treaties of Brazil
Treaties of the People's Republic of China
Treaties of Colombia
Treaties of Czechoslovakia
Treaties of the Czech Republic
Treaties of Denmark
Treaties of the Dominican Republic
Treaties of Finland
Treaties of Gabon
Treaties of Guinea
Treaties of Germany
Treaties of the Hungarian People's Republic
Treaties of Ba'athist Iraq
Treaties of Italy
Treaties of Kazakhstan
Treaties of Lesotho
Treaties of Luxembourg
Treaties of Mexico
Treaties of Mongolia
Treaties of Montenegro
Treaties of Norway
Treaties of Panama
Treaties of Russia
Treaties of Serbia
Treaties of Slovakia
Treaties of Sweden
Treaties of Turkey
Treaties of Uruguay
Treaties of Guatemala
1988 in labor relations